Jules Ghislain Plancquaert (28 December 1903 – 16 April 1983) was a Belgian philatelist who was added to the Roll of Distinguished Philatelists in 1975.

References

Signatories to the Roll of Distinguished Philatelists
1903 births
1983 deaths
Belgian philatelists
Fellows of the Royal Philatelic Society London